The 1930 Iowa Hawkeyes football team represented the University of Iowa in the 1930 college football season. Iowa played only one conference game during the 1930 season as they were banned from the Big Ten Conference in January 1930 during the time the conference scheduled football games, before being reinstated in February.

Schedule

References

Iowa
Iowa Hawkeyes football seasons
Iowa Hawkeyes football